The Economic Development and Labour Bureau, headed by the Secretary for Economic Development and Labour, was responsible for economic development and labour issues in the Hong Kong Government. 

It was abolished on 1 July 2007, with its functions transferred to the Commerce and Economic Development Bureau, Transport and Housing Bureau and Labour and Welfare Bureau.

Before the Principal Officials Accountability System was introduced on 1 July 2002, it was known Economic Services Bureau. Responsibilities with labour issues were then the portfolio of the former Education and Manpower Bureau.

The following departments used to report to the Secretary for Economic Development and Labour:
 Civil Aviation Department  (transferred to Transport and Housing Bureau on 1 July 2007)
 Marine Department (transferred to Transport and Housing Bureau on 1 July 2007)
 Hongkong Post (transferred to Commerce and Economic Development Bureau on 1 July 2007)
 Hong Kong Observatory (transferred to Commerce and Economic Development Bureau on 1 July 2007)
 Labour Department  (transferred to Labour and Welfare Bureau on 1 July 2007)
 Tourism Commission (transferred to Commerce and Economic Development Bureau on 1 July 2007)
Permanent secretaries
Economic Development: 
Sandra Lee (2002-2006)
Eva Cheng (2006-2007)
Labour (who doubled as the Commission of Labour): 
Matthew Cheung (2002-2007)
Paul Tang (2007)

Economy of Hong Kong
Hong Kong government defunct offices